William James Henderson is a Scottish former professional footballer. After playing for local amateur side Penicuik Athletic, Henderson attended a trial with Newcastle United. Although unsuccessful, he was instead recommended to Third Division South side Cardiff City by Jimmy Nelson, a Newcastle player who had previously been with Cardiff. He scored on his debut during a 2–1 victory over Aldershot on 4 February 1933. Despite the club's struggles, Henderson finished the season with twelve league goals from sixteen matches, including five during a 6–0 victory over Northampton Town. He remained with the Bluebirds the following season but, despite finishing the season as the club's joint top goalscorer with Eli Postin, he was one of a number of players released by manager Ben Watts-Jones after the club finished bottom of the Football League.

References

Year of birth missing
People from Kilbirnie
Scottish footballers
Penicuik Athletic F.C. players
Cardiff City F.C. players
English Football League players
Association football forwards